The Weekend was a pop rock band from London, Ontario, Canada. 

The Weekend has lent its music to feature film soundtracks (Freaky Friday, Uptown Girls, D.E.B.S.) and television shows such as The Simple Life 2 and Mary-Kate and Ashley's So Little Time.

The band name led fellow Canadian musician The Weeknd to spell his name without the last “e”, to avoid copyright issues.

History
Co-founders Andrea Wasse (vocals, chief songwriter) and Link C.(synthesizer, programming) were in high school when they formed the band with Lorien Jones (bass) and Mike Clive (drums). Their first performance was in 1998. Originally a swing band who were part of the 90's swing revival, the band reoriented towards pop and power pop. 

Its second performance was as an opening act for an audience of over 500 people. The Weekend quickly gained a loyal audience in the Southwestern Ontario independent music scene.

2000–2005
The Weekend issued three albums produced as pop music with themes that revolve around the attainment of 'perfect love'. They travelled worldwide and with popularity in Asia and Australia. In 2004, it toured Indonesia as part of Soundrenaline 2004, the largest rock music festival in the country.

Solo work (2004-2010)
Andrea Wasse co-wrote for Canadian Idol (2004), CTV Television series Instant Star, and album tracks for artists Jenna G and Amanda Stott.

Wasse co-wrote "Watch Me Move" performed by Fefe Dobson. "I'm a Lady"  is another one of the songs Wasse co-wrote. The songs appeared on Dobson's album Joy released in November 2010.

Discography

The Weekend (2000)
 "The Single"
 "New Fast (Right Behind You)"
 "My Way"
 "What I Die For"
 "Fleetwood"
 "High School America"
 "Drummer"
 "Maracas"
 "Cindy"
 "Heard It On the Radio"
 "Boy You" -  bonus outtake track.

Teaser EP (2002)
 "Bring It On"
 "80's Rockstar"
 "Perfect World"
 "Victory"
 "Out of Sight"

Teaser + Bonus Level (2003)
 "Bring It On"
 "80's Rockstar"
 "Perfect World"
 "Victory"
 "Out of Sight"
 "Work It Out"
 "The Single"
 "Baby C'mon (Nu New Fast)"
 "Me vs. the World"
 "Workin' for The Weekend"
 "Boy You" - bonus (non-outtake) track. 
 "Do This" - bonus outtake track from previous album's sessions - iTunes store exclusive.

Kiss Kiss (2003) -- Exclusive to Australia and Japan
 "80's Rockstar"
 "Bring It On"
 "Perfect World"
 "NYLA"
 "Into the Morning"
 "Victory"
 "Out of Sight"
 "Work It Out"
 "Sex Kitten"
 "Anything for You"
 "Boy You" - bonus (non-outtake) track.

Beatbox My Heartbeat (2005)
 "Into The Morning"
 "There Goes My Heart"
 "Temporary Insanity"
 "Cold Feet"
 "Disconnected"
 "NYLA"
 "California"
 "Pretty from the Outside"
 "Start It"
 "Flipside"

References

External links
 New Music Canada Web Site

1998 establishments in Ontario
Canadian pop rock music groups
Musical groups established in 1998
Musical groups from London, Ontario